Çelebi is a town and district of Kırıkkale Province in the Central Anatolia region of Turkey. At the 2000 Turkish census the population of the district was 7,210, of whom 3,333 lived in the town of Çelebi.

Notes

References

External links 
 District governor's official website 
 District municipality's official website 

Populated places in Kırıkkale Province
Districts of Kırıkkale Province